"Break It/Get Myself Back" is a double A-side single released by Japanese recording artist Namie Amuro. It was released on July 28, 2010, through Avex Trax. Break It was used in a Coca-Cola Zero commercial. The song reached number three on Oricon's weekly chart. The single has been certified Gold for shipment of 100,000 copies, as well as "Get Myself Back" being certified as a gold download to cellphones., it serves two lead singles for her tenth studio album Uncontrolled.

Music video 

The music video for "Get Myself Back" features Amuro in several different locations. She first appears on a beach standing ankle-deep in the water. Another location includes standing next to tree, and also in a large grassy field.

The music video for "Break It" consists of Amuro and back-up dancers in a techno-style building, and in parts of it, Amuro standing beside a motorbike.

Track listing

Charts

Oricon sales chart

"Break It"

"Get Myself Back"

Credits 
Produced by Nao'ymt
Written by Namie Amuro
Mixed by D.O.I.
Mastered by Tom Coyne
Recorded by Ryousuke Kataoka
Guitar by Shinji Omura (Tr. 1 & 3)

References 

2010 singles
Namie Amuro songs
2010 songs